The 2022 Munster Senior Hurling Championship Final was a hurling match that was played on 5 June at Semple Stadium in Thurles. It was contested by defending champions Limerick and Clare.

The game was televised live on RTÉ 2 as part of the Sunday Game presented by Joanne Cantwell. Commentary on the game was provided by Marty Morrissey alongside Michael Duignan.

Limerick captained by Declan Hannon retained the title for the fourth year in a row after a 1-19 to 0-29 win after extra-time.

Build-up
The winning team were the first winners of the new Mick Mackey Cup. The two teams were meeting in the Munster final for the first time since 1995.

On 26 May the Munster Council confirmed that the final was a sell-out after 11,000 Terrace Tickets sold out in 11 minutes.

Details

References

Munster Final
Munster Senior Hurling Championship Finals